Babang (Tibetan: Palpung) is a rural Tibetan township in Dêgê County, Garzê Prefecture, Sichuan, China.  The township is primarily concentrated around the Pal Chu river in the western reaches of the Chola Mountains on the east side of the Jinsha River.  The township contains significant remaining tracts of the Hengduan conifer forests.

See also 
 List of township-level divisions of Sichuan

References

Populated places in the Garzê Tibetan Autonomous Prefecture
Township-level divisions of Sichuan